From Sydney with Love is a Hindi movie directed by Prateek Chakravorty, starring Sharad Malhotra, Bidita Bag, Karan Sagoo and Evelyn Sharma. The music has been composed by Sohail Sen, Thor Patridge, and Nabin Laskar.

Plot

It was a dream come true for Meghaa Banerjee, a small town girl in West Bengal, India when she earned a scholarship from the prestigious University of New South Wales in Australia to pursue her master's degree in Economics with inevitable butterflies in her stomach. She embarks upon her maiden expedition to Sydney leaving her protective shell and family behind. Coming from a conservative middle-class background, life and culture in Sydney was an instant eye opener for her. Under guidance of her caring cousin Kalpana fondly called "Kol", Meghaa slowly embraces her new life in Sydney where she makes new set of friends, which includes cherubic Lubaina, prankster Raj, and narcissistic Suhail. Love and romance was something that was strictly not in her agenda of things. However being young at heart it was just something waiting to happen to her when she met Rohit - a charismatic, full of sheen and friendly natured fellow student in the University with whom she starts gelling right from the beginning.

Cast
Sharad Malhotra as Rohit Khurana
Bidita Bag as Meghaa Banerjee
Prateek Chakravorty as Raj Bakshi
Evelyn Sharma as Lubaina Snyder
Sabyasachi Chakrabarty as Prof. Banerjee
Karan Sagoo as Suhail Syed
Reshmi Ghosh as Kalpana Chatterjee

Soundtrack

The music of the film was composed by Sohail Sen. Soundtrack includes Naino Ne Naino Se, sung by Palak Muchhal and Sohail Sen.

References

External links
 

2012 films
2010s Hindi-language films
Films scored by Sohail Sen